Brotman is a surname. Notable people with the surname include:

Charlie Brotman (born 1928), American public relations specialist and public address announcer
Jeffrey Brotman (1942–2017), American lawyer and businessman
Stanley Brotman (1924–2014), American judge
Stuart Brotman (born 1952), American management consultant and lawyer